Nalanda was a renowned mahavihara (Buddhist monastic university) in ancient Magadha (modern-day Bihar), India. Operating from 427 until 1197 CE, Nalanda played a vital role in promoting the patronage of arts and academics during the 5th and 6th century CE, a period that has since been described as the "Golden Age of India" by scholars. Before it was destroyed and burned much of its facilities at the beginning of the twelfth century by the Islamic invader Bakhtiyar Khilj, Nalanda held over 9 million texts.

Nalanda was established during the Gupta Empire era, and was supported by numerous Indian and Javanese patrons – both Buddhists and non-Buddhists. Over some 750 years, its faculty included some of the most revered scholars of Mahayana Buddhism. Nalanda mahavihara taught six major Buddhist schools and philosophies such as Yogachara and Sarvastivada as well as subjects such as grammar, medicine, logic and mathematics. The university was also a major source of the 657 Sanskrit texts carried by pilgrim Xuanzang and the 400 Sanskrit texts carried by Yijing to China in the 7th century, which influenced East Asian Buddhism. Many of the texts composed at Nalanda played an important role in the development of Mahayana and Vajrayana Buddhism including the Mahavairocana Tantra and the Bodhisattvacaryāvatāra of Shantideva. It was sacked and destroyed by the troops of Muhammad Bakhtiyar Khalji, partly restored thereafter, and continued to exist till about 1400 CE. Today, it is a UNESCO World Heritage Site.

In 2010, the Government of India passed a resolution to revive the famous university, and a contemporary institute, Nalanda University, was established at Rajgir. It has been listed as an "Institute of National Importance" by the Government of India.

Location
The Nalanda archaeological site is spread over a large area to the northwest of Bargaon (Nalanda) village, and is between the historical manmade lakes Gidhi, Panashokar and Indrapuskarani. On the south bank of the Indrapushkarani lake is the Nava Nalanda Mahavihara – a university founded in its memory.

Etymology
According to the early 7th-century Tang dynasty Chinese pilgrim, Xuanzang, the local tradition explains that the name  (Hindi/Magahi: नालन्दा) came from a nāga (serpent deity in Indian religions) whose name was Nalanda. He offers an alternate meaning "charity without intermission", from "na-alam-da"; however, this split does not mean this.

In some Tibetan sources, including the 17th-century work of Taranatha, Nalanda is referred to as Nalendra, and is likely synonymous with Nala, Nalaka, Nalakagrama found in Tibetan literature.

History

Early history of the city of Nalanda (1200 BCE–300 CE) 

The history of Nalanda in the 1st-millennium BCE is linked to the nearby city of Rajagriha (modern Rajgir) – the capital of Magadha and on the trade routes of ancient India. Early Buddhist texts state that Buddha visited a town near Rajagriha called Nalanda on his preregrinations. He delivered lectures in a nearby mango grove named Pavarika and one of his two chief disciples, Shariputra, was born in the area and later attained nirvana there. These Buddhist texts were written down centuries after the death of the Buddha, are not consistent in either the name or the relative location. For example, texts such as the Mahasudassana Jataka states that Nalaka or Nalakagrama is about a yojana (10 miles) from Rajagriha, while texts such as Mahavastu call the place Nalanda-gramaka and place it half a yojana away. A Buddhist text Nikayasamgraha does state that emperor Ashoka established a vihara (monastery) at Nalanda. However, archaeological excavations so far have not yielded any monuments from Ashoka period or from another 600 years after his death.

Chapter 2.7 of the Jaina text Sutrakritanga states that Nalanda is a "suburb" of capital Rajagriha, has numerous buildings, and this is where Mahavira (6th/5th century BCE) spent fourteen varshas – a term that refers to a traditional retreat during monsoons for the monks in Indian religions. This is corroborated in the Kalpasutra, another cherished text in Jainism. However, other than the mention of Nalanda, Jaina texts do not provide further details, nor were they written down for nearly a millennium after Mahavira's death. Like the Buddhist texts, this has raised questions about reliability and whether the current Nalanda is same as the one in Jaina texts. According to Scharfe, though the Buddhist and Jaina texts generate problems with place identification, it is "virtually certain" that the modern Nalanda is near or the site these texts are referring to.

Archaeological excavations at sites near Nalanda, such as the Juafardih site about 3 kilometers away, have yielded black ware and other items. These have been carbon dated to about 1200 BCE. This suggests that the region around Nalanda in Magadha had a human settlement centuries before the birth of the Mahavira and the Buddha.

Faxian visit (399–412 CE) 

When Faxian, a Chinese Buddhist pilgrim monk, visited the city of Nalanda, there probably was no university yet. Faxian had come to India to acquire Buddhist texts, and spent 10 years in India in the early fifth century, visiting major Buddhist pilgrimage sites including the Nalanda area. He also wrote a travelogue, which inspired other Chinese and Korean Buddhists to visit India over the centuries; in it he mentions many Buddhist monasteries and monuments across India. However, he makes no mention of any monastery or university at Nalanda even though he was looking for Sanskrit texts and took a large number of them from other parts of India back to China. Combined with a lack of any archaeological discoveries of pre-400 CE monuments in Nalanda, the silence in Faxian's memoir suggests that Nalanda monastery-university did not exist around 400 CE.

Foundation (5th century) 

Nalanda's dateable history begins in the 5th century. A seal discovered at the site identifies a monarch named Shakraditya as its founder and attributes the foundation of a sangharama (monastery) at the site to him. This is corroborated by the Chinese pilgrim Xuanzang travelogue. The tradition of formalized Vedic learning "helped to inspire the formation of large teachings centres," such as Nalanda, Taxila, and Vikramashila.

In the Indian tradition and texts, kings were called by many epithets and names. Scholars such as Andrea Pinkney and Hartmut Scharfe conclude that Shakraditya is same as Kumaragupta I. He was one of the kings in the Hindu dynasty of the Guptas. Further, numismatic evidence discovered at Nalanda corroborate that Kumaragupta I was the founder patron of the Nalanda monastery-university.

His successors, Budhagupta, Tathagatagupta, Baladitya, and Vajra, later extended and expanded the institution by building additional monasteries and temples. Nalanda, thus flourished through the 5th and 6th centuries under the Guptas. These Gupta-era contributions to Nalanda are corroborated by the numerous Buddhist and Hindu seals, artwork, iconography and inscriptions discovered at Nalanda, which are in the Gupta-style and Gupta-era scripts. During this period, the Gupta kings were not the only patrons of Nalanda. They reflect a broad and religiously diverse community of supporters. It is remarkable, states Scharfe, that "many donors were not Buddhists; the emblems on their seals show Lakshmi, Ganesha, Shivalinga and Durga".

Post-Gupta dynasty (550–600 CE) 
After the decline of the Guptas, the most notable patron of the Nalanda Mahavihara was Harsha (known as Śīlāditya in some Buddhist records). He was a seventh-century emperor with a capital at Kannauj (Kanyakubja). According to Xuanzang, Harsha was a third generation Hindu king from the Vaishya caste, who built majestic Buddhist viharas, as well as three temples – Buddha, Surya and Shiva, all of the same size. He states (c. 637 CE), "a long succession of kings" had built up Nalanda till "the whole is truly marvellous to behold".

In accordance with the ancient Indian traditions of supporting temples and monasteries, inscriptions found at Nalanda suggest that it received gifts, including grants of villages by kings to support its work. Harsha himself granted 100 villages and directed 200 households from each of these villages to supply the institution's monks with requisite daily supplies such as of rice, butter, and milk. This supported over 1,500 faculty and 10,000 student monks at Nalanda. These numbers, however, may be exaggerated. They are inconsistent with the much lower numbers (over 3000) given by Yijing, another Chinese pilgrim who visited Nalanda a few decades later. According to Asher, while the excavated Nalanda site is large and the number of viharas so far found are impressive, they simply cannot support 10,000 or more student monks. The total number of known rooms and their small size is such that either the number of monks must have been far less than Xuanzang's claims or the Nalanda site was many times larger than numerous excavations have so far discovered and what Xuanzang describes.

Xuanzang's visit (630–643 CE) 
Xuanzang travelled around India between 630 and 643 CE, visiting Nalanda in 637 and 642, spending a total of around two years at the monastery. He was warmly welcomed in Nalanda where he received the Indian name of Mokshadeva and studied under the guidance of Shilabhadra, the venerable head of the institution at the time. He believed that the aim of his arduous overland journey to India had been achieved as in Shilabhadra he had at last found an incomparable teacher to instruct him in Yogachara, a school of thought that had then only partially been transmitted to China. Besides Buddhist studies, the monk also attended courses in grammar, logic, and Sanskrit, and later also lectured at the Mahavihara.

In the detailed account of his stay at Nalanda, the pilgrim describes the view out of the window of his quarters thus,

Xuanzang returned to China with 657 Sanskrit texts and 150 relics carried by 20 horses in 520 cases. He translated 74 of the texts himself.

Yijing's visit (673–700 CE) 
In the thirty years following Xuanzang's return, no fewer than eleven travellers from China and Korea are known to have visited Nalanda, including the monk Yijing. Unlike Faxian and Xuanzang, Yijing followed the sea route around Southeast Asia and Sri Lanka. He arrived in 673 CE, and stayed in India for fourteen years, ten of which he spent at the Nalanda Mahavihara. When he returned to China in 695, he had with him 400 Sanskrit texts and 300 grains of Buddha relics which were subsequently translated in China.

Unlike Xuanzang, who also described the geography and culture of seventh-century India, Yijing's account primarily concentrates on the practice of Buddhism in India and detailed descriptions of the customs, rules, and regulations of the monks at the monastery. In his chronicle, Yijing notes that revenues from 200 villages (as opposed to 100 in Xuanzang's time) had been assigned toward the maintenance of Nalanda. He described there being eight vihara with as many as 300 cells. According to him, Nalanda monastery has numerous daily Nikaya procedures and rules for the monks. He gives many examples. In one subsection he explains that the monastery has ten great pools. The morning begins with the ghanta (bell) being rung. Monks take their bathing sheets and go to one of these pools. They bathe with their underwear on, then get out slowly to avoid disturbing anyone else. They wipe their bodies, then wrap this 5 foot long and 1.5 foot wide sheet around the waist, change their clothes with this wrap in place. Then rinse, wring and dry the sheet. The entire procedure, says Yijing, is explained in the Buddhist Nikaya procedures. The day must begin with bathing, but bathing after meals is forbidden. The Nalanda Nikaya has many such daily procedures and rituals set out for the monks to follow.

Korean and Tibetan pilgrims (650–1400 CE)

In addition to Chinese pilgrims, Buddhist pilgrims from Korea also visited India about the same time as Xuanzang and Yingji. The Chinese travelogues about India became known in the 19th century and have been well published. After mid-20th century, the Korean pilgrim journeys have come to light. For example, monks such as Kyom-ik began visiting Indian monasteries by the mid-6th century. They too carried Indian texts and translated them, producing 72 chuan of translated texts. In the mid-7th century, the Silla (Korean: 신라) monk Hyon-jo visited and stayed at several Indian monasteries, including three years at Nalanda, his visit corroborated by Yingji. He sent his students Hye-ryun and Hyon-gak to Nalanda for studies, the latter died at Nalanda. They adopted Indian names to interact with the fellow students; for example, Hye-ryun was known as Prajnavarman and it is this name that is found in the records. According to Korean records, monks visited India through the ninth century – despite arduous travel challenges – to study at various monasteries, and Nalanda was the most revered.

In and after the 7th century, Tibetan monks such as Thonmi Sambhota came to Nalanda and other Indian monasteries to study, not only Buddhism, but Sanskrit language, grammar and other subjects. Sambhota is credited with applying the principles of Sanskrit and its grammar to remodel Tibetan language and its script. It was after Sambhota's first return from Nalanda that the Tibetan king adopted Buddhism and committed to making it the religion of his people. Tibetan monks lived closer to Nepal, Sikkim and eastern India, with simpler travel itineraries than the Koreans and others. Tibetans continued to visit Magadha during the Pala era, and beyond through the 14th century, thereby participated in the crucible of ideas at Nalanda and other monasteries in Bihar and Bengal. However, after the 8th century, it was the esoteric mandala and deities-driven Vajrayana Buddhism that increasingly dominated the exchange. After the Islamic conquest, the destruction and the demise of Nalanda, other monasteries and Buddhist culture from the plains of Bihar and Bengal, the brand memory of "Nalanda" remained the most revered in Tibet. In 1351, Tibetans committed to recreating a monastery in the heart of Tibet, staffing it with monk-scholars from diverse Buddhist schools, and name it the "Nalanda monastery" in the honor of the ancient Nalanda, according to the Blue Annals (Tibetan: དེབ་ཐེར་སྔོན་པོ). This institution emerged north of Lhasa in 1436 through the efforts of Rongtön Mawé Sengge, then expanded in the 15th century. It is now called the Tibetan Nalanda, to distinguish it from this site.

Pala dynasty (750–1200 CE)

The Palas established themselves in eastern regions of India in mid-8th century and reigned until the last quarter of the 12th century. They were a Buddhist dynasty. However, under the Palas, the traditional Mahayana Buddhism of Nalanda that inspired East Asian pilgrims such as Xuanzang was superseded by the then newly emerging Vajrayana tradition, a Tantra-imbibed, eros- and deity-inclusive esoteric version of Buddhism. Nalanda continued to get support from the Palas, but they subscribed to Vajrayana Buddhism and they were prolific builders of new monasteries on Vajrayana mandala ideas such as those at Jagaddala, Odantapura, Somapura, and Vikramashila. Odantapura was founded by Gopala, the progenitor of the royal line, only  from Nalanda. These competing monasteries, some just a few kilometers away from Nalanda likely drew away a number of learned monks from Nalanda.

Inscriptions, literary evidence, seals, and ruined artwork excavated at the Nalanda site suggest that Nalanda remained active and continued to thrive under the Palas. Kings Dharmapala and Devapala were active patrons. A number of 9th-century metallic statues containing references to Devapala have been found in its ruins as well as two notable inscriptions. The first, a copper plate inscription unearthed at Nalanda, details an endowment by the Shailendra King, Balaputradeva of Suvarnadvipa (Sumatra in modern-day Indonesia). This Srivijayan king, "attracted by the manifold excellences of Nalanda" had built a monastery there and had requested Devapala to grant the revenue of five villages for its upkeep, a request which was granted. The Ghosrawan inscription is the other inscription from Devapala's time and it mentions that he received and patronised a learned Vedic scholar named Viradeva who was later elected the head of Nalanda.

Inscriptions issued between the 9th and 12th centuries attest gifts and support to Nalanda for the upkeep of the monastery, maintenance of the monks, copying of palm leaf manuscripts (necessary for preservation given the Indian tropical climate). One inscription also mentions the destruction of a Nalanda library of manuscripts by fire, and support for its restoration. Another 10th-century inscription quotes Bhadracari of the Sautrantikas tradition, attesting the activity of diverse schools of Buddhism at Nalanda. Another Nalanda inscription from the 11th century mentions a gift of "revolving bookcase".

While the Palas continued to patronize Nalanda liberally, the fame and influence of Nalanda helped the Palas. The Srivijaya kingdom of southeast Asia maintained a direct contact with Nalanda and the Palas, thus influencing the 9th to 12th century art in Sumatra, Java, southern Thailand and regions that actively traded with the Srivijaya kingdom. The influence extended to the Indonesian Shailendra dynasty. The Indonesian bronzes and votive tablets from this period show the creativity of its people, yet the iconographic themes overlap with those found at Nalanda and nearby region. Monks from Indonesia, Myanmar and other parts of southeast Asia came to Nalanda during the Pala rule.

Destruction under Bakhtiyar Khalji (c. 1200 CE) 

The troops of the Ghurid dynasty general Muhammad Bakhtiyar Khalji destroyed and began the demise of Nalanda and other monasteries near it, such as the Odantapura Vihar (now called Bihar Sharif) about 6 miles away from Nalanda. This destruction is corroborated by three sources, which are congruent but contain uncertainties that raise some questions as well a minor dispute about the exact date. The first evidence is from a Muslim historian. The second are the records found in Tibet of Buddhist monks from the 13th century onwards. The third evidence is archaeological, where layers of charcoal deposits were discovered covering ruins, remains of the Nalanda libraries, and other damaged artworks. Buddhist studies scholars and historians such as Peter Harvey, Charles Prebish, Damien Keown, Donald Mitchell, Steven Darian, Stephen Berkwitz and others attribute Nalanda's destruction to Bakhtiyar Khalji.

The first evidence is from the Persian historian, Minhaj-i-Siraj who in his Tabaqat-i Nasiri writes of a loot and massacre near Bihar Sharif:

This record of Minhaj-i-Siraj is not an eyewitness account, but it is an account of Samsamuddin who was with Muhammad-i Bakhtiyar Khalji, and Minhaj-i-Siraj merely summarizes it. The above abridged quote refers to an attack on a Buddhist monastery (the "Bihar" or Vihara) and its monks (the shaved Brahmans). Minhaj-i-Siraj record dates it to 1193 CE, prefaces the above quoted sentences with "Khalji had already been busy a year or two in this region" before this attack, and mentions the sack of a college-monastery in the context of an Islamic conquest of Bihar Sharif region, but he does not explicitly state it was Nalanda. It could have been one of several monasteries near Nalanda. However, considering that these two Mahaviharas were only a few kilometres apart and little qualms about the massacre of clean shaven residents there, it is very likely that Minhaj-i-Siraj summary is not an extensive record and both befell a similar fate. The other great Mahaviharas of the age such as Vikramshila and later, Jagaddala, also met their ends at the hands of the Turks at around the same time.

The Tibetan records are the second source of the events at Nalanda in the late 12th century and much of the 13th century. These were the decades of widespread systematic destruction of monasteries in this region, and historical records in Tibet affirm that monks from Nalanda and nearby monasteries such as the Vikramashila monastery who "survived the slaughter, fled to Tibet", according to Scharfe. Among the Tibetan records, the most useful is the biography of the Tibetan monk-pilgrim, Dharmasvamin discovered in 1936 and in bsdus-yig style, Tibetan script. It is useful because Dharmasvamin met the fleeing monks and famous scholars during his studies from about mid 1200s to 1226, he had learnt Indian languages and Sanskrit, he walked to and stayed in Nepal starting in 1226 and visited Bihar about 1234, including spending one monsoon season in Nalanda. He described the condition in the decades after the sack of Nalanda and other Buddhist monasteries in Magadha-region of India. His account states that the destruction of Nalanda was not an accident or misunderstanding but a part of the widespread destruction of Buddhist monasteries and monuments including a destruction of Bodhgaya. The vast manuscript libraries of Magadha had been mostly lost. Other Tibetan monks and he had shifted to Nepal, as the place to study, copy and move manuscripts to Tibet. According to his account, the Turushka-Qarluq (Turk) conquest extended from about 1193 to 1205, the destruction was systematic with "Turushka soldiers razing a monastery to the ground and throwing the stones into Ganges river", states Roerich. The fear of persecution was strong in the 1230s, and his colleagues dissuaded him from going to Magadha. According to George Roerich, "his [Chag lo-tsa-ba Chos-rje-dpal, Dharmasvamin] account conveys something of the anxiety of [the Buddhist community of] those days."

Chapter 10 of Dharmasvamin's biography describes Nalanda in c. 1235 CE. Dharmasvamin found it "largely damaged and deserted". Despite the perils, some had re-gathered and resumed the scholastic activities in Nalanda, but at a vastly smaller scale and with donations from a wealthy Brahmin layperson named Jayadeva. His account states:

While he stayed there for six months under the tutelage of Rahula Shribhadra, Dharmasvamin makes no mention of the legendary library of Nalanda which possibly did not survive the initial wave of Turkic attacks. He also states that some structures had survived, with "eighty small viharas, built of bricks and many left undamaged" but "there was absolutely no one to look after them". He recites the arrest of their patron and lay-supporter Jayadeva by Muslim soldiers who threaten to kill him for honoring (supporting) the monks of Nalanda. Jayadeva sends them a message that the Turushka soldiers are sure to kill "Guru [Rahulasribhadra] and his disciples" and they should "flee!".

Dharmasvamin also provides an eyewitness account of an attack on the derelict Mahavihara by the Muslim soldiers stationed at nearby Odantapura (now Bihar Sharif) which had been turned into a military headquarters. Only the Tibetan and his nonagenarian instructor stayed behind and hid themselves while the rest of the monks fled. Another Tibetan source is that of Lama Taranatha, but this is from the late 16th century, and it is unclear what its sources were. The Taranatha account about Buddhism in India repeats the legendary accounts of Nalanda from the Buddha and Ashoka periods found in Xuanzang and other sources, then shifts to centuries of the 2nd-millennium. It describes Islamic raids in 12th-century India, states that whole of Magadha fell to the Turushka (Turks, a common term for Muslims in historic Indic and Tibetan texts). Their armies, asserts Taranatha, destroyed Odantapuri as well as Vikramashila. Given the hundreds of years of gap between the events and Taranatha's account, and no clear chain of sources within the Tibetan tradition of record keeping, its reliability is questionable.

The third evidence is the discovery of thick layer of ashes and charcoal discovered during the archaeological excavations on the uppermost strata, inscribed artwork and soil, and this layer was found over many buildings separated by some distance. This suggests that Nalanda's destruction was accompanied with a widespread fire after the mid-12th century. This corroborates Dharmasvamin account of the destruction.

Tibetan texts such as the 18th-century work named Pag sam jon zang and 16th/17th-century Taranatha's account include fictional Tibetan legends. These include stories such as a king Cingalaraja had brought "all Hindus and Turuskas [Muslims]" up to Delhi under his control, and converted from Brahmanism to Buddhism under the influence of his queen, and he restoring the monasteries. Others state that a southern king built thousands of monasteries and temples again, Muslim robbers murdered this king, thereafter Nalanda was repaired by Mudita Bhadra and a minister named Kukutasiddha erected a temple there. One describes the tale of two angry Tirthika (Brahmanical) monks, who gain magical powers by tantric siddha, spread ashes that erupt a fire that destroyed one of Nalanda's three libraries – Ratnodadhi, but magical water poured out of a manuscript that prevented damage and learned Buddhist monks rewrote the texts that were damaged. However, there is no evidence for the existence of such a king (or sultan), minister, Muslim robbers, thousands of Buddhist monuments built in India between the 13th and 19th century, or of any significant Nalanda repairs in or after the 13th century.

Johan Elverskog – a scholar of religious studies and history, states that it is incorrect to say Nalanda's end was sudden and complete by about 1202, because it continued to have some students well into the 13th century. Elverskog, relying on Arthur Waley's 1932 paper, states that this is confirmed by the fact a monk ordained in 13th-century Nalanda traveled to the court of Khubilai Khan. He adds that it is wrong to say that Buddhism ended in India around the 13th or 14th century or earlier, because "[Buddha] Dharma survived in India at least until the 17th-century".

Impact of its destruction and influence on Tibetan Buddhist Tradition 
The last throne-holder of Nalanda, Shakyashri Bhadra of Kashmir, fled to Tibet in 1204 at the invitation of the Tibetan translator Tropu Lotsawa (Khro-phu Lo-tsa-ba Byams-pa dpal). Some of the surviving Nalanda books were taken by fleeing monks to Tibet. He took with him several Indian masters: Sugataśrī, (an expert in Madhyamaka and Prajñāpāramitā); Jayadatta (Vinaya); Vibhūticandra (grammar and Abhidharma), Dānaśīla (logic), Saṅghaśrī (Candavyākaraṇa), Jīvagupta (books of Maitreya), Mahābodhi,(Bodhicaryāvatāra); and Kālacandra (Kālacakra).

Tibetan Buddhist tradition is regarded to be a continuation of the Nalanda tradition. The Dalai Lama states:

The Dalai Lama refers to himself as a follower of the lineage of the seventeen Nalanda masters.

An Astasahasrika Prajnaparamita Sutra manuscript preserved at the Tsethang monastery has superbly painted and well preserved wooden covers and 139 leaves. According to its colophon it was donated by the mother of the great pandita Sri Asoka in the second year of the reign of King Surapala, at the very end of the 11th century.
Nalanda still continued to operate into the 14th century as the Indian monk, Dhyānabhadra was said to have been a monk at Nalanda prior to his travels in East Asia.

Under the East India Company and British Empire (1800–1947) 
After its decline, Nalanda was largely forgotten until Francis Buchanan-Hamilton surveyed the site in 1811–1812 after locals in the vicinity drew his attention to some Buddhist and Brahmanical images and ruins in the area. He, however, did not associate the mounds of earth and debris with famed Nalanda. That link was established by Major Markham Kittoe in 1847. Alexander Cunningham and the newly formed Archaeological Survey of India conducted an official survey in 1861–1862. Systematic excavation of the ruins by the ASI did not begin until 1915 and ended in 1937. The first four excavations were led by Spooner between 1915 and 1919. The next two were led by Sastri in 1920 and 1921. The next seven seasons of archaeological excavations through 1928 were led by Page. These efforts were not merely digging, observation and cataloging of discoveries, they included conservation, restoration and changes to the site such as drainage to prevent damage to unearthed floors. After 1928, Kuraishi led two seasons of excavations, Chandra led the next four. The last season was led by Ghosh, but the excavations were abbreviated in 1937 for financial reasons and budget cuts. Chandra and final ASI team leaders noted that the "long row of monasteries extend further into the modern village of Bargaon" and the "extent of entire monastic establishment can only be determined by future excavations".

Post–independence (Post-1947)
Post independence, the second round of excavation and restoration took place between 1974 and 1982. In 1951, the Nava Nalanda Mahavihara (New Nalanda Mahavihara), a modern centre for Pali and Buddhism in the spirit of the ancient institution, was founded by the Government of Bihar near Nalanda's ruins at the suggestion of Rajendra Prasad, India's first president. It was deemed to be a university in 2006.

1 September 2014 saw the commencement of the first academic year of a modern Nalanda University, with 15 students, in nearby Rajgir. Nalanda University (also known as Nalanda International University) is an international and research-intensive university located in the historical city of Rajgir in Bihar, India. It was established by an Act of Parliament to emulate the famous ancient university of Nalanda, which functioned between the 5th and 13th centuries. The idea to resurrect Nalanda University was endorsed in 2007 at the East Asia Summit, represented mostly by Asian countries including China, Singapore, Japan, Malaysia and Vietnam, apart from Australia and New Zealand, and as such, the university is seen as one of the flagship projects of the Government of India. It has been designated as an "Institution of National Importance" by the Parliament, and began its first academic session on 1 September 2014. Initially set up with temporary facilities in Rajgir, a modern campus spanning over 160 hectares (400 acres) is expected to be finished by 2020. This campus, upon completion, will be the largest of its kind in India, and one of the largest in Asia.

The Mahavihara
The subjects taught at Nalanda covered every field of learning, and it attracted pupils and scholars from Korea, Japan, China, Tibet, Indonesia, Persia and Turkey.

The university 
At its peak the school attracted scholars and students from near and far, with some travelling from Tibet, China, Korea, and Central Asia. The highly formalised methods of Buddhist studies helped the establishment of large teaching institutions such as Taxila, Nalanda, and Vikramashila, which are often characterised as India's early universities. Archaeological evidence also notes contact with the Shailendra dynasty of Indonesia, one of whose kings built a monastery in the complex. Nalanda flourished under the patronage of the Gupta Empire in the 5th and 6th centuries, and later under Harsha, the emperor of Kannauj. The liberal cultural traditions inherited from the Gupta age resulted in a period of growth and prosperity until the ninth century CE. The subsequent centuries were a time of gradual decline, a period during which the tantric developments of Buddhism became most pronounced in eastern India under the Pala Empire.

Much of our knowledge of Nalanda comes from the writings of pilgrim monks from Asia, such as Xuanzang and Yijing, who travelled to the Mahavihara in the 7th century CE. Vincent Smith remarked that "a detailed history of Nalanda would be a history of Mahayanist Buddhism." Many of the names listed by Xuanzang in his travelogue as alumni of Nalanda are the names of those who developed the overall philosophy of Mahayana. All students at Nalanda studied Mahayana, as well as the texts of the eighteen (Hinayana) sects of Buddhism. Their curriculum also included other subjects, such as the Vedas, logic, Sanskrit grammar, medicine, and Samkhya.

Nalanda was destroyed three times but was rebuilt only twice. While some sources note that the Mahavihara continued to function in a makeshift fashion after this attack, it was eventually abandoned altogether and forgotten until the 19th century, when the site was surveyed and preliminary excavations were conducted by the Archaeological Survey of India. Systematic excavations commenced in 1915, which unearthed eleven monasteries and six brick temples neatly arranged on grounds  in area. A trove of sculptures, coins, seals, and inscriptions have also been discovered in the ruins, many of which are on display in the Nalanda Archaeological Museum, situated nearby. Nalanda is now a notable tourist destination, and a part of the Buddhist tourism circuit.

On 25 November 2010, the Indian government, through an Act of Parliament, 'resurrected' the ancient university through the Nalanda University Bill, with which they chose to create a new and unrelated Nalanda University relatively nearby. It has been designated as an "International University of National Importance," and has accordingly been subject to intense government oversight, with both of its past chancellors explicitly citing Government actions for them leaving their post and courses being shut down due to members of the ruling party disapproving of them.

The library

It is evident from the large numbers of texts that Yijing carried back with him after his 10-year residence at Nalanda, that the Mahavihara must have featured a well-equipped library. Traditional Tibetan sources mention the existence of a great library at Nalanda named Dharmaganja (Piety Mart) which comprised three large multi-storeyed buildings, the Ratnasagara (Ocean of Jewels), the Ratnodadhi (Sea of Jewels), and the Ratnaranjaka (Jewel-adorned). Ratnodadhi was nine storeys high and housed the most sacred manuscripts including the Prajnyaparamita Sutra and the Guhyasamaja.

The exact number of volumes in the Nalanda library is not known, but it is estimated to have been in the hundreds of thousands. When a Buddhist scholar at Nalanda died, his manuscripts were added to the library collection. The library not only collected religious manuscripts but also had texts on such subjects as grammar, logic, literature, astrology, astronomy, and medicine. The Nalanda library must have had a classification scheme which was possibly based on a text classification scheme developed by the Sanskrit linguist, Panini. Buddhist texts were most likely divided into three classes based on the Tripitaka's three main divisions: the Vinaya, Sutra, and the Abhidhamma.

Curriculum
In his biography of Xuanzang, Hwui-Li states that all the students of Nalanda studied the Great Vehicle (Mahayana) as well as the works of the eighteen (Hinayana) sects of Buddhism. In addition to these, they studied other subjects such as the Vedas, Hetuvidyā (Logic), Shabdavidya (Grammar and Philology), Chikitsavidya (Medicine), the works on magic (the Atharvaveda), and Samkhya. According to Frazier, the Vedic studies included Vedic texts and ritual, but also the different theoretical disciplines associated with the limbs or the sciences of the Vedas, which included disciplines such as linguistics, law, astronomy and reasoning.

Xuanzang himself studied a number of these subjects at Nalanda under Shilabhadra and others. Besides Theology and Philosophy, frequent debates and discussions necessitated competence in Logic. A student at the Mahavihara had to be well-versed in the systems of Logic associated with all the different schools of thought of the time as he was expected to defend Buddhist systems against the others. Other subjects believed to have been taught at Nalanda include law, astronomy, and city-planning.

Tibetan tradition holds that there were "four doxographies" which were taught at Nalanda:

 Sarvastivada Vaibhashika
 Sarvastivada Sautrantika
 Madhyamaka, the Mahayana philosophy of Nagarjuna
 Chittamatra, the Mahayana philosophy of Asanga and Vasubandhu

In the 7th century, Xuanzang recorded the number of teachers at Nalanda as being around 1510. Of these, approximately 1000 were able to explain 20 collections of sutras and shastras, 500 were able to explain 30 collections, and only 10 teachers were able to explain 50 collections. Xuanzang was among the few who were able to explain 50 collections or more. At this time, only the abbot Shilabhadra had studied all the major collections of sutras and shastras at Nalanda.

Administration
The Chinese monk Yijing wrote that matters of discussion and administration at Nalanda would require assembly and consensus on decisions by all those at the assembly, as well as resident monks:

Xuanzang also noted:

Influence on Buddhism 

A vast amount of what came to comprise Tibetan Buddhism, both its Mahayana and Vajrayana traditions, stems from the teachers and traditions at Nalanda. Shantarakshita, who pioneered the propagation of Buddhism in Tibet in the 8th century was a scholar of Nalanda. He was invited by the Tibetan king, Khri-sron-deu-tsan, and established the monastery at Samye, serving as its first abbot. He and his disciple Kamalashila (who was also of Nalanda) essentially taught Tibetans how to do philosophy. Padmasambhava, who was also invited from Nalanda Mahavihara by the king in 747 CE, is credited as a founder of Tibetan Buddhism.

The scholar Dharmakirti, one of the Buddhist founders of Indian philosophical logic, as well as one of the primary theorists of Buddhist atomism, taught at Nalanda.

Other forms of Buddhism, such as the Mahayana Buddhism followed in Vietnam, China, Korea and Japan, flourished within the walls of the ancient school. A number of scholars have associated some Mahayana texts such as the Shurangama Sutra, an important sutra in East Asian Buddhism, with the Buddhist tradition at Nalanda. Ron Epstein also notes that the general doctrinal position of the sutra does indeed correspond to what is known about the Buddhist teachings at Nalanda toward the end of the Gupta period when it was translated.

Several Buddhist institutions overseas have chosen to call themselves Nalanda to acknowledge Nalanda's influence. These include Nalanda Buddhist Society in Malaysia and Nalanda College, Colombo, Sri Lanka, Nalanda Buddhist Education Foundation, Indonesia, Nalanda Buddhist Institute, Bhutan

World Heritage Sites Recognization 
The Nalanda Mahavihara site is in the State of Bihar, in north-eastern India. It comprises the archaeological remains of a monastic and scholastic institution dating from the 3rd century BCE to the 13th century CE. It includes stupas, shrines, viharas (residential and educational buildings) and important art works in stucco, stone and metal. Nalanda stands out as the most ancient university of the Indian Subcontinent. It engaged in the organized transmission of knowledge over an uninterrupted period of 800 years. The historical development of the site testifies to the development of Buddhism into a religion and the flourishing of monastic and educational traditions.

Historical figures associated with Nalanda 
Traditional sources state that Nalanda was visited by both Mahavira and the Buddha in  6th and 5th century BCE. It is also the place of birth and nirvana of Shariputra, one of the famous disciples of Buddha.

Other historical figures associated with Nalanda include:

 Aryabhata
 Aryadeva, student of Nagarjuna
 Asanga, proponent of the Yogacarya school 
 Atisha, Mahayana and Vajrayana scholar
 Buddhaguhya, Vajrayana Buddhist monk and scholar 
 Chandrakirti, student of Nagarjuna
 Dharmakirti, logician
 Dharmapala
 Dhyānabhadra
 Dignaga, founder of Buddhist Logic
 Kamalaśīla, abbot of Nalanda
 Maitripada, Indian Buddhist Mahasiddha
 Nagarjuna, formaliser of the concept of Shunyata
 Naropa, student of Tilopa and teacher of Marpa
 Śāntarakṣita, founder of Yogācāra-Mādhyamika
 Shantideva, composer of the Bodhisattvacarya
 Shilabhadra, the teacher of Xuanzang
 Vajrabodhi, 7th–8th century Indian esoteric monk and one of the patriarchs of Chinese Esoteric Buddhism and Shingon Buddhism
 Vasubandhu, brother of Asanga 
 Xuanzang, Chinese Buddhist traveller
 Yijing, Chinese Buddhist traveller

Excavated remains

After its decline, Nalanda was largely forgotten until Francis Buchanan-Hamilton surveyed the site in 1811–1812 after locals in the vicinity drew his attention to a vast complex of ruins in the area. He, however, did not associate the mounds of earth and debris with famed Nalanda. That link was established by Major Markham Kittoe in 1847. Alexander Cunningham and the newly formed Archaeological Survey of India conducted an official survey in 1861–1862. Systematic excavation of the ruins by the ASI did not begin until 1915 and ended in 1937. The second round of excavation and restoration took place between 1974 and 1982.

Excavations have revealed eleven monasteries (also known as vihara) and six major brick temples arranged in an ordered layout. Most structures show evidence of multiple periods of construction with new buildings being raised atop the ruins of old ones. Many of the buildings also display signs of damage by fire on at least one occasion.

The map gives the layout of the excavated structures. Temple 3 in the south was the most imposing structure. Temple 12, 13, 14 face the monasteries and face east. With the exception of those designated 1A and 1B, the monasteries all face west with drains emptying out in the east and staircases positioned in the south-west corner of the buildings. Temple 2 was to the east.

All the monasteries at Nalanda are very similar in layout and general appearance. Their plan involves a rectangular form with a central quadrangular court which is surrounded by a verandah which, in turn, is bounded by an outer row of cells for the monks – a typical design of vihara architecture. The central cell facing the entrance leading into the court is a shrine chamber. Its strategic position means that it would have been the first thing that drew the eye when entering the edifice. With the exception of those designated 1A and 1B, the monasteries all face west with drains emptying out in the east and staircases positioned in the south-west corner of the buildings.

Monastery 1 is considered the oldest and the most important of the monastery group and shows as many as nine levels of construction. Its lower monastery is believed to be the one sponsored by Balaputradeva, the Srivijayan king, during the reign of Devapala in the 9th century (see Nalanda copper-plate of Devapala). The building was originally at least 2 storeys high and contained a colossal statue of a seated Buddha.

Temple no. 3 (also termed Sariputta Stupa) is the most iconic of Nalanda's structures with its multiple flights of stairs that lead all the way to the top. The temple was originally a small structure which was built upon and enlarged by later constructions. Archaeological evidence shows that the final structure was a result of at least seven successive such accumulations of construction. The fifth of these layered temples is the most interesting and the best preserved with four corner towers of which three have been exposed. The towers as well as the sides of the stairs are decorated with exquisite panels of Gupta-era art depicting a variety of stucco figures including Buddha and the Bodhisattvas, scenes from the Jataka tales. The temple is surrounded by numerous votive stupas some of which have been built with bricks inscribed with passages from sacred Buddhist texts. The apex of Temple no. 3 features a shrine chamber which now only contains the pedestal upon which an immense statue of Buddha must have once rested. According to Win Maung, the stupa was influenced by Gupta architecture, which itself had Kushana era influences. In a shrine near the bottom of the staircase, a large image of Avalotiteshvar was found which was eventually moved to the museum.

Temple no. 2 notably features 211 sculptured religious and secular panels. These include Shiva, Parvati, Kartikeya, and Gajalakshmi, Kinnaras playing musical instruments, various representations of Makaras, as well as human couples in amorous postures, as well as scenes of art and of everyday life. Susan Huntington and Bhaskara Misra – scholars of Indian architecture and arts, state Temple 2 as a Hindu temple. However, Huu Phuoc Le – a scholar of Buddhist architecture, questions this purely "Hindu affiliation", stating that it could be a temple based on the mandala principles, and one reflecting "Hindu-Buddhist syncretism" of the 8th to 12th century when Shaiva and Shakti deities were integrated into Vajrayana Buddhism. The site of Temple no. 13 features a brick-made smelting furnace with four chambers. The discovery of burnt metal and slag suggests that it was used to cast metallic objects.

To the north of Temple 13 lie the remains of Temple no. 14. An enormous image of the Buddha was discovered here. The image's pedestal features fragments of the only surviving exhibit of mural painting at Nalanda.

To the east of Temple 2, lie the remains of Sarai Temple in the recently excavated Sarai Mound. This multi-storeyed Buddhist temple with many stupas and shrines was enclosed by a massive wall enclosure.

Numerous sculptures, as well as many murals, copper plates, inscriptions, seals, coins, plaques, potteries and works in stone, bronze, stucco, and terracotta, have been unearthed within the ruins of Nalanda. The Buddhist sculptures discovered notably include those of the Buddha in different postures, Avalokiteshvara, Jambhala, Manjushri, Marichi, and Tara. Brahmanical idols of Vishnu, Shiva-Parvathi, Ganesha, Mahishasura Mardini, and Surya have also been found in the ruins.

A Black Buddha temple (termed by locals as the Telia Bhairav, "tel" refers to use of oil) is near Temple 14 with has an ancient large black Buddha image in bhumisparha mudra. This the same temple termed Baithak Bhairab in Cunningham's 1861–62 ASI report.

Surviving Nalanda manuscripts
Fleeing monks took some of the Nalanda manuscripts. A few of them have survived and are preserved in collections such as those at:

 Los Angeles County Museum of Art Folios from a Dharanisamgraha, circa 1075.
 Asia Society This Ashtasahasrika Prajnaparamita manuscript records, in Sanskrit and Tibetan, the history of the manuscript from its creation at the famous Nalanda monastery in India through its use in Tibet by the compiler of the first Tibetan canon of Buddhism, Buton.
 Yarlung Museum, Tsetang (From the On ke ru Lha khang monastery) Astasahahasrika Prajnaparamita Sanskrit palm-leaf manuscript, with 139 leaves and painted wooden covers. According to the colophon, this manuscript was donated by the mother of the great pandita Sri Asoka in the second year of the reign of King Surapala at end of the 11th century.

Nalanda inscriptions
A number of inscriptions were found during the excavation, which are now preserved in the Nalanda Museum. These include:
 Son of a minister of Yashovarman donated to the temple built by king Baladitya. 8th cent CE, basalt slab found in monastery 1.
 Murnavarman constructed an  brass image of Buddha. 7th cent CE, basalt slab, found in Sarai mound. 
 Monk Vipulshrimitra built a monastery. Basalt slab, later half of 12th cent, found in the uppermost level of Monastery 7. 
 Donation of Balaputradeva, the king of Suvarnadvipa of Sailendra dynasty. 860 CE Copperplate found by Hirananda Shastri in 1921 in the antechamber of Monastery 1 at Nalanda.

Tourism

Nalanda is a popular tourist destination in the state attracting a number of Indian and overseas visitors. It is also an important stop on the Buddhist tourism circuit.

Nalanda Archaeological Museum

The Archaeological Survey of India maintains a museum near the ruins for the benefit of visitors. The museum, opened in 1917, exhibits the antiquities that have been unearthed at Nalanda as well as from nearby Rajgir. Out of 13,463 items, only 349 are on display in four galleries.

Xuanzang Memorial Hall

The Xuanzang Memorial Hall is an Indo-Chinese undertaking to honour the famed Buddhist monk and traveller. A relic, comprising a skull bone of the Chinese monk, is on display in the memorial hall.

Nalanda Multimedia Museum
Another museum adjoining the excavated site is the privately run Nalanda Multimedia Museum. It showcases the history of Nalanda through 3-D animation and other multimedia presentations.

Gallery

See also
Related Sites and Place

 Telhara – Telhara was the site of a Buddhist monastery in ancient India
 Bakhtiarpur – named after Bakhtiar Khilji who destroyed Nalanda Mahavira

Ancient Indian learning centers:
 Jagaddala, Bengal
 Odantapuri, adjacent to Nalanda
 Pushpagiri Vihara, Odissa
 Sharada Peeth, Kashmir
 Somapura, Bengal
 Taxila, Punjab
 Teladhaka, near Nalanda
 Vallabhi, Gujarat
 Vikramashila, Bihar

Further reading 
 Ancient higher-learning institutions
 List of Monuments of National Importance in Bihar
 Kurkihar hoard

Notes

References

Bibliography

 
 
 
 
 
 
  The account was narrated by Dharmasvamin to his student, Chos-dar.

External links

The life of Hiuen-Tsiang (1914) by Xuanzang's biographer, Hwui Li (translated by Samuel Beal), p. 105-113
A record of the Buddhist religion as practised in India and the Malay archipelago (1896) by Yijing (translated by J. Takakasu), searchable for Nalanda
Pag Sam Jon Zang (Dpag bsam ljon bzaṅ), Part I: History of the Rise, Progress, and Downfall of Buddhism in India (1908) by Sumpa Khan-po Yeçe Pal Jor (in Tibetan with an index in English, edited by Sarat Chandra Das)
Tabakat-i-Nasiri – A General History of the Muhammadan Dynasties of Asia Including Hindustan by Minhaj-i-Siraj (translated by Major H. G. Raverty), p. 552.
Rajgir | District Nalanda, Government of Bihar | India
Misc

Seals and figurines from Nalanda at the British Museum
 Interactive walking tour from Google

 
Buddhist sites in Bihar
Ancient universities of the Indian subcontinent
Buddhist universities and colleges
Buddhist libraries
Former Buddhist temples
Former populated places in India
History of Bihar
Archaeological sites in Bihar
Buddhist pilgrimage sites in India
Cities and towns in Nalanda district
Education in Bihar
Nalanda district
Ruins in India
5th-century establishments in India
Educational institutions established in the 5th century
World Heritage Sites in India
Ancient libraries
Religious organizations established in the 5th century
Religious organizations disestablished in the 13th century
Indo-Aryan archaeological sites
Tourist attractions in Nalanda district